Bland Williams Ballard (October 16, 1761 – September 5, 1853) was a soldier and statesman from Kentucky.

Biography

Bland Williams Ballard was born on October 16, 1761, in Spotsylvania County, Virginia, the eldest son of Bland Ballard. In 1779, he moved with his father to Kentucky, where the younger Ballard served in the militia. In 1788, Ballard's father and family were killed by Delaware Indians in what is now Shelby County, Kentucky. Later in life, Ballard said he had killed thirty to forty Indians in battle to avenge his family and punish Indians for horse theft.

Ballard married three times. He and his first wife Elizabeth Williamson were the parents of seven children. Elizabeth died in 1827, and he married Diana Matthews in 1833. Diana died in 1835, in 1841 Ballard married Elizabeth Weaver Garrett.

Ballard served as a scout in George Rogers Clark's 1780 expedition into the Ohio country. During the Northwest Indian War, he served as a scout for Clark's 1786 Wabash campaign. Ballard participated in the battles of Fallen Timbers (1794), Tippecanoe (1811), and the River Raisin (1813). As a major of Kentucky volunteers, he played a leading role in the expedition against the British and American Indians who had invaded southeastern Michigan. He was wounded and taken prisoner at the Battle of Frenchtown, but was among the group of prisoners who were transported into Canada and so escaped the River Raisin Massacre. Following the war, Ballard served as a Delegate from Shelby County in the 1800, 1803 and 1805 Kentucky General Assembly.

Legacy
Bland Ballard is the namesake of both Blandville, Kentucky and Ballard County, Kentucky.

When Ballard died in 1853, he was initially buried in Shelbyville, Kentucky. In 1854 the State of Kentucky moved his and his first wife's remains to the State Memorial section of the Frankfort Cemetery. His namesake grandson, Bland Ballard, was appointed by Abraham Lincoln as a judge for the United States District Court for the District of Kentucky.

References

External links

1761 births
Politicians from Fredericksburg, Virginia
1853 deaths
People from Kentucky
American people of the Northwest Indian War
People from Kentucky in the War of 1812
War of 1812 prisoners of war held by the United Kingdom
Burials at Frankfort Cemetery